Aggie Appleby, Maker of Men is a 1933 American pre-Code comedy film directed by Mark Sandrich and written by Humphrey Pearson and Edward Kaufman. The film stars Charles Farrell, Wynne Gibson, William Gargan, ZaSu Pitts, Betty Furness and Blanche Friderici. The film was released on November 3, 1933, by RKO Pictures.

Plot
Streetwise Agnes "Aggie" Appleby (Wynne Gibson), waitress at Nick's Restaurant, gets into a mass fight and escapes with friend Red Branaham (William Gargan). The fight was about her honor. They live together, but the money isn't coming in, as it should. Red Branaham is caught by the police and put into jail. Her landlady (Jane Darwell) puts her out as she is unable to pay the rent. So, Aggie goes to her friend Sybby (ZaSu Pitts), a cleaning lady who puts Aggie in the room of a man who's not expected for some time so she can get some sleep.  The man, Adoniram 'Schlumpy' Schlump (Charles Farrell), however, comes back earlier than expected and finds Aggie in his bed. She pretends to be a broke socialite. He is a gentleman, very much in love with a young woman of means, Evangeline (Betty Furness), whose letter he's expecting urgently. He's also seeking work. 

Aggie calls him "an old goose" before she starts her program to remake his personality and to help help him find a job at the construction site on the other side of the road. Schlump asks Aggie to marry him, but she's not sure whether she still loves Red. She also fears that their different social and cultural background could become a problem. Auntie (Blanche Friderici) and Evangeline pop up at his room, so Aggie has to pretend to be a maid. Aggie ultimately sends Schlumpy back to Evangeline.

Cast
Charles Farrell as Adoniram "Schlumpy" Schlump 
Wynne Gibson as Agnes "Aggie" Appleby
William Gargan as Red Branahan
ZaSu Pitts as Sybby "Sib"
Betty Furness as Evangeline
Blanche Friderici as Aunt Katherine

References

External links
 

1933 films
1933 romantic comedy films
American black-and-white films
American romantic comedy films
1930s English-language films
Films about social class
Films directed by Mark Sandrich
Films set in New York City
RKO Pictures films
1930s American films